Fuchsia is a 2009 Filipino drama-comedy film directed by Joel Lamangan. It stars Gloria Romero, Eddie Garcia, and Robert Arevalo.

Cast
Gloria Romero as Mameng
Eddie Garcia as Marcelino "Mars"
Robert Arevalo as Generoso "Gener"
Armida Siguion-Reyna as Juana
Celia Rodriguez as Priscilla
Gina Alajar as Nena
Iza Calzado as Elizabeth
Tony Mabesa as Mayor Sunga
Raquel Villavicencio as Mrs. Sunga
Richard Quan as Milo
Jim Pebanco as Poloy
Nanding Josef as Kandong
Allan Noble as Mayor Sunga's Men
John Lapid as Mayor Sunga's Men
Ed Tambunting as Mayor Sunga's Men
Dante Javier as Chief of Police
Nido De Jesus as Policemen
Noel Elmido as Policemen
Jojo Lopez as Policemen
Vic Romano as Policemen
Josie Tagle as Susan
Josie Del Rosario as Mameng's relative
Marivic Mejay as Mameng's relative
Lourdes Serrano as Mameng's relative
Cecil Magcamit as Mameng's maid

Awards and Nominations

References

External links
 

Philippine comedy-drama films
Films directed by Joel Lamangan